The Southeast Region is one of ten United States regions that currently send teams to the Little League World Series, the largest youth baseball competition in the world. The region's participation in the LLWS dates back to 1957, when it was known as the South Region.  However, when the LLWS was expanded in 2001 from eight teams (four U.S. teams and four "International" teams from the rest of the world) to 16 teams (eight U.S. and eight International), the Southern Region was split into the Southeast and Southwest Regions.

The Southeast Region is made up of eight southeastern states.

 Georgia

Regional headquarters have been located in Warner Robins, Georgia since 2008. The regional tournament moved to Warner Robins in 2010. Prior to 2010, St. Petersburg, Florida hosted the tournament.

Regional championship

The year's winner is indicated in green. Columbus in 2006 and Warner Robins in 2007 went on to become the World Series champions.

LLWS results
As of the 2022 Little League World Series.

Results by state
As of the 2022 Little League World Series.

Format
As with all other regions, the tournament offers a "modified double elimination" format.  Teams compete in a double-elimination tournament format with the exception of the championship game, which is a one-game, "winner take all," game regardless of the number of previous tournament losses by either team.

Notes
 Peachtree City National Little League of Peachtree City, Georgia won the Georgia state tournament by defeating Columbus Northern. However, Peachtree City was stripped of their title by virtue of having twelve players on the team whose league age was 12 years old. Little League regulations state that the maximum number for a team is eight.

References

See also
Southwest Region (Little League World Series)
South Region (Little League World Series)

External links
Official site
Southeast Region Little League Tournament Historical Results

Southeast
Baseball competitions in the United States
Sports in the Southern United States